Nuggehalli Rangaraj Prithviraj is an Indian actor who appeared in Kannada films and Kannada television serials. He appeared in over 116 films and 64 television serials in his four-decade-long career.

Film career

Prithviraj started his career as Engineer and retired as Assistant Manager in Indian Telephone Industries, Bengaluru. His interest in acting and Amateur Theater attracted him to films and his film career started in a role in the Kannada Film Accident by the Malgudi Days Fame Director and Kannada Actor Shankar Nag. Prithvi has acted in around 116 Kannada films in Supporting Actor Role of which his memorable roles were in the Movies Jeevana Chaitra, Parashuram, Odahuttidavaru with Dr. Rajkumar and in the movie Doctor Krishna with Dr. Vishnuvardhan. He has also done many movies with other popular stars of Kannada cinema Ambareesh in Saptapadi, Gandu Sidigundu, and Anant Nag's Ganeshana Madhuve, Ondu Cinema Kathe, Gauri Ganesha, Malla with Ravichandran.   He also worked in Supporting Character roles for younger generation of Kannada Actors like Shivaraj Kumar, Sudharani, Puneeth Rajkumar, Sudeep and many more. He was one of the Sought after Supporting Actors of Kannada Cinema and Television Serials.

Television

TV Serials from 1985 to 1999

 Namma Nammalli 
 Ajitana Saahasagalu 
 Sanghatane 
 Kaamanabillu 
 Shh Vicaarane Nadeyutide 
 Devru Devru Devru 
 Shivabhakta Kannappa
 Dharitri

TV Serials from 1999 till 2017

 Neeti Chakra 
 Belli There 
 Danda Pindagalu 
 Abhimana 
 Saptapadi 
 Chaduranga 
 Nitya 
 Saahasa lakshmi 
 Jagalagantiyaru
 Kusumanjali 
 Mugilu 
 Malegalalli Madumagalu
 Prerana 
 Aantarya 
 Minchu 
 Mukta (TV series)
 Mumbelagu 
 Chandrachakori 
 Swarga
 Beedige Biddavaru
 Mobile 
 Radha Kalyana
 Parampare
 Olave Jeevana Saakshaatkaara 
 Amruthavarshini 
 Pattedaari Pratibha 
 Natyarani Shantala  
 Nighooda

Hindi Serials
 Malgudi Days
 Stree

Awards

 Prithviraj won best actor Dr. Rajkumar Prashasti at National Amateur Drama competition in 1981 
 He won best actor awards thrice for his role in Kaamana Billu Serial

Filmography

 Accident (1985)
 Thrishula (1985)
 Bidugadeya Bedi (1985)
 Lancha Lancha Lancha (1986)
 Henne Ninagenu Bandhana (1986) 
 Ravana Rajya (1987)
 Sambhavami Yuge Yuge (1988)
 Parashuram (1989)
 Doctor Krishna (1989)
 Prathap (1990)
 Mruthyunjaya (1990)
 Ganeshana Maduve (1990)
 Modada Mareyalli [Actor(Kari Kaala)] (1991)
 Krama (1991)
 Gowri Ganesha (1991)
 Gandu Sidigundu (1991)
 Saptapadi (1992)
 Purushotthama (1992)
 Ondu Cinema Kathe (1992)
 Midida Shruthi (1992)
 Jeevana Chaithra (1992)
 Agni Panjara (1992)
 Nanendu Nimmavane (1993)
 Kempaiah IPS (1993)
 Hoovondu Beku Ballige (1993)
 Apoorva Jodi (1993)
 Anuragada Alegalu (1993)
 Sammilana (1994)
 Odahuttidavaru (1994)
 Mutthanna (1994)
 Lockup Death (1994)
 Gandugali (1994)
 Savya Sachi (1995)
 Lady Police (1995)
 Killer Diary (1995)
 Shreemathi Kalyana (1996)
 Circle Inspector (1996)
 Boss (1996)
 Aayudha (1996)
 Aadithya (1996)
 Shreemathi (1997) 
 Sangliyana Part-3 (1997)
 Ganesha I Love You (1997)
 April Fool (1997)
 King (1998)
 Arjun Abhimanyu (1998)
 AK 47 (1999)
 Sparsha (2000)
 Deepavali (2000)
 Chamundi (2000)
 Asthra (2000)
 Vande Matharam (2001)
 Sri Manjunatha (2001)
 Mysore Huli (2001)
 Halu Sakkare (2001)
 Saadhu (2002)
 Nandi (2002)
 Nagarahavu (2002)
 Love U (2002)
 Dhum (2002)
 Appu (2002) 
 Swathi Mutthu (2003)
 Mane Magalu (2003)
 Tada Khaidi (2003)
 Yardo Duddu Yellammana Jathre (2004)
 Bidalare (2004)
 Target (2004)
 Monalisa (2004)
 Malla (2005)
 Deadly Soma (2005)
 News (2005)
 Magic Ajji (2005)
 Rakshasa (2005)
 Udees (2005)
 Encounter Dayanayak (2005)
 Maharaja (2005)
 Ambi (2006)
 Hatavadi (2006)
 Uppi Dada MBBS (2006)
 Ugadi (2007)
 Soundarya (2007)
 Parodi (2007)
 Gulabi Talkies [Dubbing Artist] (2008)
 Prachanda Ravana (2008)
 Bindaas (2008) 
 Preethi Andre Ishtena (2010) 
 Preethiyinda Ramesh (2010) 
 Sogasugara (2011)
 Cauvery Nagara (2013)
 Chakravyuha (2016)

References

1948 births
Male actors in Kannada cinema
Indian male film actors
Kannada male actors
People from Hassan district
20th-century Indian male actors
21st-century Indian male actors
Male actors from Karnataka
Living people